The French School of the Far East, abbreviated EFEO, is an associated college of PSL University dedicated to the study of Asian societies.  It was founded in 1900 with headquarters in Hanoi in what was then French Indochina. After the independence of Vietnam, its headquarters were transferred to Phnom Penh in 1957 and subsequently to Paris in 1975. Its main fields of research are archaeology, philology and the study of modern Asian societies.
Since 1907, the EFEO has been in charge of conservation work at the archeological site of Angkor.

EFEO romanization system 

A romanization system for Mandarin was developed by the EFEO. It shares a few similarities with Wade-Giles and Hanyu Pinyin. In modern times, it has been superseded by Hanyu Pinyin.

The differences between the three romanization systems are shown in the following table:

Directors
1900: Louis Finot
1905: Alfred Foucher
1908: Claude-Eugène Maitre
1920: Louis Finot
1926: Léonard Aurousseau
1929: George Cœdès
1947: Paul Lévy
1950: Louis Malleret
1956: Jean Filliozat
1977: François Gros
1989: Léon Vandermeersch
1993: Denys Lombard
1998: Jean-Pierre Drège
2004: Franciscus Verellen
2014: Yves Goudineau
2018: Christophe Marquet
2022: Nicolas Fiévé

Publications 
The catalog of EFEO Publications, of some 600 titles, includes works on a wide range of disciplines in the humanities and social sciences (archaeology, history, anthropology, literature, philology, etc.), centered on Asia, from India to Japan. These publications are directed at specialists and a wider public interested in Asian civilizations and societies.

The EFEO in publishes five scholarly journals on an annual or twice-yearly basis:
Bulletin de l'École française d'Extrême-Orient - BEFEO (Bulletin of the French School of Asian Studies), published since 1901
Arts Asiatiques (Asian Arts), published jointly with the Musée Guimet and the CNRS
Cahiers d'Extrême-Asie (East Asian Journal), published in Kyoto
Aséanie (Southeast Asian Studies), published in Bangkok
Sinologie française [S: 法国汉学, T: 法國漢學, P: Fǎguó Hànxué] (French Sinology), published in Chinese in Beijing

See also 
EFEO Chinese transcription

References

External links 

 
 Writing in western European languages that deal with China 

Educational institutions established in 1907
Universities and colleges in France
Archaeological research institutes
Research institutes in France
1907 establishments in France
Asian studies